Lucas Krom Stone House is a historic home located at Rochester in Ulster County, New York.  The property includes the house, Dutch barn, and smokehouse. The house is a linear -story stone dwelling built in two sections.  In the rear is a two-story frame ell.

It was listed on the National Register of Historic Places in 1995.

References

Houses on the National Register of Historic Places in New York (state)
Houses completed in 1760
Houses in Ulster County, New York
National Register of Historic Places in Ulster County, New York